Gopalpur (Bengali:গোপালপুর) is a town of Gopalpur Upazila, Tangail, Bangladesh. The town is situated 44 km north of Tangail city and 127 km northwest of Dhaka city, the capital of Bangladesh. The town consists of 9 wards and 35 Mahallas.

Demographics
According to Population Census 2011 performed by Bangladesh Bureau of Statistics, The total population of Gopalpur town is 50,160. There are 12539 households in total.

Education
The literacy rate of Gopalpur town is 49.5% (Male-51.7%, Female-47.3%).

See also
 Bhuapur
 Sakhipur

References

 

Populated places in Dhaka Division
Populated places in Tangail District
Pourashavas of Bangladesh
Tangail District